The 3rd North Carolina Infantry Regiment was a regiment of the Confederate States Army, formed shortly after the commencement of the American Civil War in May 1861.

Formation
The unit completed its organization at Garysburg, North Carolina, in May, 1861. The men were volunteers from Wilmington and the counties of Green, Duplin, Cumberland, Onslow, Bladen, New Hanover, and Beaufort. In July part of the regiment moved to Richmond, Virginia, where some weeks later it was joined by the remaining companies.

Combat experience
The regiment fought in many battles during the Civil War. At the Battle of Gettysburg the unit suffered terrible casualties, losing forty percent of the 548 men engaged. In April 1865 it surrendered, with just 4 officers and 53 men remaining.

See also
List of North Carolina Confederate Civil War units

References
Wood, Thomas Fanning; Koonce, Donald B. (2000). Doctor to the Front: The Recollections of Confederate Surgeon Thomas Fanning Wood, 1861-1865. Univ. of Tennessee Press. p. 122. .

Notes

External links
 3rd North Carolina Infantry Regiment Retrieved 23 February 2018
 Regimental History Retrieved 1 March 2018

Units and formations of the Confederate States Army from North Carolina